Tanahat Monastery, is an 8th-century monastery located 7 km south-east of Vernashen village in the Vayots Dzor Province of Armenia. It was built between the 8th and 13th centuries.

References

External links 

About Tanahat Monastery

Christian monasteries in Armenia
Tourist attractions in Vayots Dzor Province
Christian monasteries established in the 13th century
Oriental Orthodox congregations established in the 13th century
Buildings and structures in Vayots Dzor Province